Waisea Daveta (born 28 March 1989) is a Fijian rugby union footballer. He plays for the Suva rugby team and usually plays as a prop. 
He was part of the Fiji team at the 2011 Rugby World Cup.

References

1989 births
Living people
Fijian rugby union players
Fiji international rugby union players
I-Taukei Fijian people
CSM Știința Baia Mare players
Expatriate rugby union players in Romania
Fijian expatriate sportspeople in Romania
Rugby union props